The Hungarian men's national ice hockey team is the national ice hockey team of Hungary. They have participated in the IIHF European Championships, the IIHF World Hockey Championships and the Olympic Games since 1928. A consistent participant of the annual World Championship, Hungary has played at the Olympics three times, most recently in 1964. They are currently ranked 19th in the world by the IIHF.

The team is controlled by the Hungarian Ice Hockey Federation (Magyar Jégkorong Szövetség). No Hungarian-born players have ever played in North America's National Hockey League; however, three have been selected in the NHL Entry Draft: Tamás Gröschl by the Edmonton Oilers (1999), Levente Szuper by the Calgary Flames (2000), and János Vas by the Dallas Stars (2002).

History

The Hungarian team won its group in the 2008 IIHF World Championship Division I, and therefore qualified to play in the Elite Division of the 2009 IIHF World Championship. This is the first time since 1939 that Hungary has qualified to play in the highest division of international hockey. The advance was, however, marred by the sudden death of team captain Gábor Ocskay, and the team was eventually relegated to Division I again.

In 2015, Hungary finished second in its group in the 2015 IIHF World Championship Division I, behind Kazakhstan to gain promotion to the 2016 IIHF World Championship.

Tournament record

Olympic Games

World Championship

Team

Former players

János Ancsin
Béla Háray
István Hircsák
László Jakabházy
Zoltán Jeney
Balázs Kangyal
Csaba Kovács, Sr.
Péter Kovalcsik
György Margó
András Mészöly
Sándor Miklós
Gábor Ocskay, Jr.
Gábor Ocskay, Sr.
Krisztián Palkovics
Antal Palla
György Pásztor
György Raffa
Levente Szuper
Viktor Zsitva

NHL Drafts
Players from Hungary to be drafted in the NHL

Notes
 Banham was drafted as a Canadian. In 2015, he acquired Hungarian citizenship.
 Sarauer was drafted as a Canadian. In 2015, he acquired Hungarian citizenship.

References

External links

IIHF profile
National Teams of Ice Hockey

 
National ice hockey teams in Europe
Ice hockey teams in Hungary